Folland is a surname. Notable people with the surname include:

Alison Folland (born 1978), American actress and filmmaker
Gerald Folland (born 1947), American mathematician
Henry Folland (1889–1954), British aviation engineer and aircraft designer
Leah Norah Folland (1874–1957), British educationalist, philanthropist and politician
Michael Fleming Folland (1949–1969), United States Army soldier
Neil Folland (born 1960), British cricketer
Nicholas Folland (born 1967), Australian artist and arts educator
Nick Folland (born 1963), British cricketer
Rob Folland (born 1979), British footballer

See also
Folland Aircraft